General elections were held in Peru on 9 June 1963 to elect the President and both houses of the Congress after the results of the 1962 elections were annulled following a military coup. Supported by Popular Action and the Christian Democrat Party, Fernando Belaúnde Terry won the presidential election with 39% of the vote, whilst the American Popular Revolutionary Alliance emerged as the largest party in both houses of Congress.

Following a coup on 3 October 1968, no further elections were held until a Constituent Assembly was elected in 1978.

Results

President

Senate

Chamber of Deputies

References

1963 in Peru
Elections in Peru
Peru
Presidential elections in Peru
Election and referendum articles with incomplete results
June 1963 events in South America